Colombani is a name of Italian origin, which may refer to:

Giuseppe Colombani (1676–1736), Italian soldier, fencing master, and dentist
Quirino Colombani (c.1668–1735),  Italian composer, musician, and music teacher
Jean-Marie Colombani (born 1948), French journalist
Paul Colombani, American pediatric surgeon
Paul-André Colombani, French politician representing Pè a Corsica
Gabriel Colombani, Canadian Architect known for his work in Institutional and transit projects

References